The 1989 Utah Utes football team represented the University of Utah as a member of the Western Athletic Conference (WAC) during the 1989 NCAA Division I-A football season. In their fifth and final season under head coach Jim Fassel, the Utes compiled an overall record of 4–8 record with a mark of 2–6 against conference opponents, finished in seventh place in the WAC, and were outscored by their opponents 524 to 365. The team played home games at Robert Rice Stadium in Salt Lake City.

Utah's statistical leaders included Scott Mitchell with 3,211 passing yards, Clifton Smith with 681 rushing yards, and Dennis Smith with 1,091 receiving yards.

Schedule

Personnel

Season summary

at BYU

After the season

NFL Draft
One Utah player was selected in the 1990 NFL Draft.

References

Utah
Utah Utes football seasons
Utah Utes football